Mentone Girls’ Secondary College is a government secondary school for girls located in Melbourne's southeast beachside suburb of Mentone, Victoria. Over 1100 students are enrolled throughout Years 7 to 12, with students transitioning to the college in Year 7 from over 50 primary schools throughout Victoria.

Overview
Mentone Girls’ Secondary College (often shortened to MGSC) is the only government girls school in the south-eastern suburbs of Melbourne, Victoria.  It is located in the bayside suburb of Mentone, a short distance from the beaches of Port Phillip Bay. More than 1100 students are enrolled over six different year levels, beginning at Year 7 and finishing with Year 12. The College is known for its prominent Band Instrumental Music Program, as well as STEAM studies. The Victorian Certificate of Education (VCE) program is made available to all students in Years 11 and 12, with students in Year 10 also having the opportunity to study a VCE subject. In 2019, the Enhancement Program was introduced to encourage students wanting a greater challenge with their learning to push themselves. The grounds of the college are used by the Victorian School of Languages (VSL) for regular classes on Saturday mornings.

History
Mentone Girls’ High School was established in early 1955 as a way to encourage female students to continue with their schooling and eventually go on to tertiary studies. When the school was opened, it is estimated that around 60 Year 8 students were enrolled. Until the school's official opening on the 11th of October 1955, classes were held in local halls. The inaugural Headmisstres Nina Carr spent a decade establishing the school’s infrastructure and educational foundations and forging her reputation as a pioneer in girls’ secondary education. Living in a flat at the school, she tended the front garden and coordinated volunteer parents’ working parties to improve the grounds. Carr left the school in 1965 after she was offered the role of principal of Mac.Roberston Girls' High School, then seen to be the most senior position available to a woman in the teaching service. The Nina Carr Centre, located on the grounds of Mentone Girls' Secondary College is named in her honour. The school was renamed in 1988, from Mentone Girls' High School to the now well known Mentone Girls' Secondary College.

Principals
 1955 - 1965: Nina Carr
 1966 - 1969: Annie McLennan
 1970 - 1972: Ruth Nicholds
 1973 - 1974: Joan Addinsall (acting)
 1975 - 1977: Gwen Northey
 1978 - 1981: Noela Eury
 1982: Peter Richardson (acting)
 1983 - 1988: Michael Constable
 1989 - 1996: Lesley Boston
 1997 - 2016: Deborah Lehner
 2016–present: Linda Brown

Curriculum  
The college is divided into three sub-schools; Junior (Years 7 and 8), Middle (Years 9 and 10), and Senior (Years 11 and 12). Year 11 and 12 students study subjects offered for the Victorian Certificate of Education (VCE), as well as Vocational Education & Training (VET) courses. During Year 10, students are given the opportunity to undertake either a VCE or VET subject as part of their individualised curriculum. In both years 7 and 8, students are required to undertake one LOTE (Languages other than English) subject of either Japanese or French.

Due to the college's large population size, it enables for a large offering of subjects. For the 2022 school year, the college will be more than 25 different VCE subjects, including a wide range of humanities and science subjects.

From Years 7 to 9, a select-entry Enhancement Program is available as an option for students who wish to seek a greater challenge.

Facilities
Located on the corner of Charman Road and Balcombe Road, the facilities of the college's sole campus include the following:

 Nina Carr Performing Arts Centre, containing a 500 seat theatre as well as music and drama rehearsal and practice rooms
 Junior Learning Centre
 VCE Centre
 Science Laboratories
 Library Resource Centre
 Multi-station Food Technology spaces
 Viewing Room
 Gymnasium, including two multi-use sports courts and a grandstand, as well as a Circuit Built Gym Room
 Tennis Courts
 Grass Oval with both AFL and Soccer Goals
 Synthetic Running Track
 STEAM Connect Centre, combing art and technology learning spaces with specialist rooms for visual arts, media studies, wood and metal technologies, and pottery kilns

College Houses
Mentone Girls' Secondary College boasts four houses; Jackson, Kenny, Melba, and Mackellar. When enrolled at the school, students are assigned a House which they will remain at for the entirety of the student's time at the college.

Houses regularly compete against one another at annual Performance, Athletics, Cross Country, and Swimming carnivals.

All four College Houses were named after prominent Australian women of history. Jackson House was named in celebrated of Marjorie Jackson; Elizabeth Kenny is the namesake of Kenny House, Mebla House is named after Dame Nellie Melba, and Dorothea Mackellar was the inspiration for Mackellar House.

References

'Evolution of a girls' school - a history', Patricia Cerni

Public high schools in Melbourne
Girls' schools in Victoria (Australia)
Alliance of Girls' Schools Australasia
Buildings and structures in the City of Kingston (Victoria)
Educational institutions established in 1955
1955 establishments in Australia